Senator Currier may refer to:

Frank Dunklee Currier (1853–1921), New Hampshire State Senate
Guy W. Currier (1867–1930), Massachusetts State Senate
Moody Currier (1806–1898), New Hampshire State Senate